is a monorail station operated by the Tokyo Tama Intercity Monorail Company in Higashiyamato, Tokyo, Japan.

Lines
Kamikitadai Station is a terminus of the 16.0 kilometer Tama Toshi Monorail Line.

Station layout
Kamikitadai Station is a raised station with two tracks and two side platforms. It has a standardized station building of the monorail line.

Platforms

Surrounding area
The station is above Tokyo Metropolitan Route 43 (Imokubo-Kaidō). Other points of interest include:
 Kita-Tama-Seibu Fire Station
 Higashiyamato Kamikitadai Post Office
 Higashiyamato City Fourth Junior High School
 Higashiyamato City Fifth Junior High School
 Tokyo Metropolitan Route 5 (Shin-Ōme-Kaidō)

History
The station opened on 27 November 1998 with the opening of the line. 

Station numbering was introduced in February 2018 with Kamikitadai being assigned TT19.

Future plans 
Plans to extend the line towards Hakonegasaki Station remain unfulfilled.

References

External links

 Tama Monorail Kamikitadai Station 

Railway stations in Japan opened in 1998
Railway stations in Tokyo
Tama Toshi Monorail
Higashiyamato, Tokyo